Goh Giap Chin (born 19 May 1995) is a former Malaysian badminton player. He was part of the Malaysian team that won gold in the 2011 BWF World Junior Championships mixed team event and silver at the 2011 Asian Junior Badminton Championships.

In 2013, Goh won a silver medal in men's singles at the 2013 Islamic Solidarity Games in Palembang. He also won the Indonesia International in 2016 and finished as runner-up at the Vietnam International in 2018 after losing to Kento Momota in the final. He is a three time men's singles champion at the Mauritius International. He was a semifinalist at the 2017 Vietnam Open Grand Prix.

Goh announced his retirement from international badminton in 2020.

Early life 
Goh was born in Butterworth in Penang. He was later drafted to the Bukit Jalil Sports School and joined the Badminton Association of Malaysia where he was coached by Hendrawan.

Achievements

Islamic Solidarity Games 
Men's singles

BWF International Challenge/Series (4 titles, 1 runner-up) 
Men's singles

  BWF International Challenge tournament
  BWF International Series tournament
  BWF Future Series tournament

References

External links 

 

1993 births
Living people
People from Penang
Malaysian sportspeople of Chinese descent
Malaysian male badminton players